Thylacoptila is a genus of snout moths. It was described by Edward Meyrick in 1885.

Species
 Thylacoptila borbonica Guillermet, 2007
 Thylacoptila paurosema Meyrick, 1885

References

Phycitini
Pyralidae genera